This is a list of football stadiums in Azerbaijan, ranked in descending order of capacity. The minimum capacity is 1,000.

See also
List of European stadiums by capacity
2012 FIFA U-17 Women's World Cup
UEFA Euro 2020

References

Azerbaijan
Stadiums
Football stadiums